The 2003 Abia State House of Assembly election was held on May 3, 2003, to elect members of the Abia State House of Assembly in Nigeria. All the 24 seats were up for election in the Abia State House of Assembly.

Results

Osisioma South 
ANPP candidate Donatus Nwankpa won the election.

Umuahia North 
PDP candidate Onyechere Onyeoziri won the election.

Umuahia Central 
PDP candidate Stanley Ohajuruka won the election.

Isiala Ngwa North 
PDP candidate Chris Enweremadu won the election.

Isiala Ngwa South 
ANPP candidate Matthew Ochiobi won the election.

Isuikwuato 
PDP candidate Monday Ejiegbu won the election.

Umuahia East 
PDP candidate Chidiebere Nwoke won the election.

Umunneochi 
PDP candidate Matthew Ibeh won the election.

Ukwa West 
PDP candidate Ngozi Ulunwa won the election.

Ukwa East 
PDP candidate Asiforo Okere won the election.

Obingwa East 
PDP candidate Eric Acho Nwakanma won the election.

Obingwa West 
PDP candidate Uche Nwankpa won the election.

Umuahia South 
ANPP candidate Leonard Onyekwere won the election.

Ikwuano 
PDP candidate Wisdom Ogbonna won the election.

Ugwunagbo 
PDP candidate Humphery Azubuike won the election.

Ohafia North 
PDP candidate Ude Oko Chukwu won the election.

Aba Central 
PDP candidate Uzor Azubuike won the election.

Osisioma North 
ANPP candidate Kingsley Mgbeahuru won the election.

Aba North 
PDP candidate Blessing Azuru won the election.

Arochukwu 
PDP candidate Agwu Ukakwu Agwu won the election.

Aba South 
ANPP candidate Cherechi Nwogu won the election.

Bende North 
PDP candidate Lekwauwa Orji won the election.

Bende South 
PDP candidate Emenike Okoroafor won the election.

Ohafia South 
PDP candidate Bernard Orji won the election.

References 

Abia State House of Assembly elections
2003 Nigerian House of Assembly elections